In mathematics, a restricted Lie algebra is a Lie algebra together with an additional "p operation."

Definition
Let L be a Lie algebra over a field k of characteristic p>0. A p operation on L is a map  satisfying
  for all ,
  for all ,

If the characteristic of k is 0, then L is a restricted Lie algebra where the p operation is the identity map.

Examples
For any associative algebra A defined over a field of characteristic p, the bracket operation  and p operation  make A into a restricted Lie algebra .

Let G be an algebraic group over a field k of characteristic p, and  be the Zariski tangent space at the identity element of G. Each element of  uniquely defines a left-invariant vector field on G, and the commutator of vector fields defines a Lie algebra structure on  just as in the Lie group case.

Restricted universal enveloping algebra
The functor  has a left adjoint  called the restricted universal enveloping algebra. To construct this, let  be the universal enveloping algebra of L forgetting the p operation. Letting I be the two-sided ideal generated by elements of the form , we set . It satisfies a form of the PBW theorem.

See also
Restricted Lie algebras are used in Jacobson's Galois correspondence for purely inseparable extensions of fields of exponent 1.

References
 .
 .
 .

Algebraic groups
Lie algebras